Cuthbert James McCall Alport, Baron Alport,  (22 March 1912 – 28 October 1998) was a Conservative Party politician, minister, and life peer.

Early life 
"Cub" Alport was educated at Haileybury College, Haileybury, Hertfordshire, England, and graduated with a degree in History and Law from Pembroke College, Cambridge in 1934. He was elected President of the Cambridge Union the following year. Alport was a tutor at Ashridge College, Little Gaddesden, Hertfordshire, from 1935 to 1937. During the Second World War, he served in the British Army as an officer in the Royal Welch Fusiliers and the King's African Rifles, and was General Staff Officer 1 (GSO 1) of the East Africa Command between 1944 and 1945. He was made a Barrister-at-Law at the Middle Temple in 1944.

Political career 
Alport was an assistant secretary for the Conservative Party Education Department between 1937 and 1939. He was Director of the Conservative Political Centre between 1945 and 1950. He was elected as the Conservative Member of Parliament for the Colchester constituency, in the 1950 general election and held the seat until 16 February 1961, when he was created Baron Alport, of Colchester in the County of Essex, a life peerage. On his elevation to the peerage, the Colchester constituency was held by the Conservatives in a by-election by Antony Buck.

Alport held the post of Assistant Postmaster-General between 1955 and 1957. He was Parliamentary Under-Secretary of State for Commonwealth Relations between 1957 and 1959. He held the office of Minister of State for the Commonwealth Relations Office between 1959 and 1961. He was invested as a Privy Councillor in 1960. He held the office of British High Commissioner to the Federation of Rhodesia and Nyasaland between 1961 and 1963. He was appointed High Steward of Colchester in 1967 and he was appointed deputy lieutenant of Essex in 1974.

Family life

In 1945 he married Rachel, the great granddaughter of George Bingham, 4th Earl of Lucan. The marriage produced three children, two girls and one boy.

Published works 
 Kingdoms in Partnership (1937)
 Hope in Africa (1952)
 The Sudden Assignment (1965)

Honourary degree 
Lord Alport was awarded an honourary doctorate by the University of Essex in July 1997.

The Alport Papers 
Lord Alport's correspondence and papers (the Alport Papers) are archived at the University of Essex library. Additional correspondence with Roy Welensky is archived at the Bodleian Library of Commonwealth and African Studies at Rhodes House, University of Oxford.

Arms

References 

 Burke's Peerage and Baronetage, 106th edition.

External links 
 
 

1912 births
1998 deaths
Alumni of Pembroke College, Cambridge
Artists' Rifles soldiers
Borough of Colchester
British Army personnel of World War II
Colchester (town)
Conservative Party (UK) MPs for English constituencies
Conservative Party (UK) life peers 
Deputy Lieutenants of Essex
King's African Rifles officers
Members of the Privy Council of the United Kingdom
Ministers in the Eden government, 1955–1957
Ministers in the Macmillan and Douglas-Home governments, 1957–1964
People educated at Haileybury and Imperial Service College
Presidents of the Cambridge Union
Royal Welch Fusiliers officers
UK MPs 1950–1951
UK MPs 1951–1955
UK MPs 1955–1959
UK MPs 1959–1964
UK MPs who were granted peerages
Life peers created by Elizabeth II